Oddrunn Kristine Helene Pettersen (5 March 1937 – 30 November 2002) was a Norwegian politician for the Labour Party who served as Minister of Administration and Consumer Affairs from April to October 1989, and Minister of Fisheries from 1990 to 1992.

References

1937 births
2002 deaths
Government ministers of Norway
Members of the Storting
Labour Party (Norway) politicians
20th-century Norwegian politicians